Scattered Practices is Ezekiel Honig's fourth album, released October 2006 by Microcosm Music.

Track listing
"Going Sailing Refrain 1" – 1:40
"Concrete and Plastic" – 3.33
"Books on Tape" – 4:58
"Going Sailing Refrain 2" – 1:49
"Going Sailing Refrain 3" – 1:51
"Fractures and Fissures (part 1)" – 3:57
"Homemade Debris" – 9:36
"Fractures and Fissures (part 2)" – 5:35
"Oceans and Living Rooms" – 4:11
"Edit Edit Edit" – 3:09

External links
Ezekiel Honig's website
Microcosm Music's website

2007 albums
Ezekiel Honig albums